Through the Chaos   is Hypernova's debut album and was released April 6, 2010 on Narnack Records. The album is produced by Herwig Maurer and mixed/engineered by Sean Beavan. The album was recorded, mixed and mastered in 2008 but the official release was pushed back to 2010. During this time a few limited edition copies were given out by the band to fans. The limited edition copies of the album were also on sale during their US national tour with The Sisters of Mercy.

Track listing

Personnel
  King Raam– Lead Vocals, rhythm guitar
  Kodi Najm – Lead Guitar, Synthesizer, Rhythm guitar
  Jam – Bass guitar
  Kami – Drums, percussion

References

2010 albums
Hypernova (band) albums